Shimelis Abdisa (Oromo: Shimallis Abdiisaa; Amharic: ሽመልስ አብዲሳ) is an Ethiopian politician serving as the president of the Oromia Region since 18 April 2019.

Life and political career 
Shimelis Abdisa was born near Ambo, West Shewa Zone, Oromia Region, Ethiopia. Before appointed as President of Oromia Region, he has served in various roles including chief of staff of Prime Minister Abiy Ahmed. For instance, he served as Head of the Office of the Prime Minister replacing Fitsum Arega, who had served as Ambassador of Ethiopia to US. On 18 April 2019, the Oromia Regional State Council appointed Shimelis as the president of the Oromia Region, preceded by Lemma Megersa. The Oromia Broadcasting Network called the election to replace Lemma Megersa. 

During emergency meeting by Holy Synod of the Ethiopian Orthodox Tewahedo Church on 5 September 2019, Shimelis vowed to protect the Church. The Ireecha was held on 4 October 2019 through towns in Oromia Region as well as Addis Ababa. Shimelis made controversial speech which recalled the oppression of Oromo people by neftenya system during Ethiopian Empire rule. Many people in social media criticized Shemelis speech whereas the Ethiopian Citizens for Social Justice Party stated that the Oromo Democratic Party used the festival for politically motivated agenda. In 2022, the head of Amhara Association of America call Shemelis to resign from office as a result of growing persecution of Amhara people in Wollega.

References

Ethiopian People's Revolutionary Democratic Front politicians
Year of birth missing (living people)
Living people